The Class 73 is a class of diesel locomotives operated by SNCB/NMBS in Belgium.

The class formed the backbone of the SNCB shunter fleet. Class 77s have replaced them but they are still to be found across Belgium. They were built in three batches: 7301-7335 during 1965–1967, 7336-7375 during 1973-1974 and finally 7373–7395 in 1976–1977.

External links 

 HLR 73
 Photos on Railfaneurope.net

National Railway Company of Belgium locomotives
C locomotives
Diesel locomotives of Belgium
Railway locomotives introduced in 1965
La Brugeoise et Nivelles locomotives
Standard gauge locomotives of Belgium
Diesel-hydraulic locomotives